The two-man competition in bobsleigh at the 2022 Winter Olympics was held on 14 February (heats 1 and 2) and 15 February (heats 3 and 4), at the Xiaohaituo Bobsleigh and Luge Track in Yanqing District of Beijing. The event was won by Francesco Friedrich and Thorsten Margis who repeated their 2018 success. Johannes Lochner and Florian Bauer won the silver medal, and Christoph Hafer and Matthias Sommer the bronze medal, for each of them the first Olympic medal. This was the only podium sweep at the 2022 Olympics.

The joint 2018 champions were Justin Kripps and Alexander Kopacz, and Friedrich and Margis. Kripps qualified for the Olympics, but now with a new brakeman, Cam Stones. The bronze medalists, Oskars Melbārdis and Jānis Strenga, stopped competing. Friedrich and Alexander Schüller were the 2021 World champions. Lochner and Eric Franke were the silver medalists, and Hans-Peter Hannighofer and Christian Röder were the bronze medalists. The 2021–22 Bobsleigh World Cup was completely dominated by Friedrich, who (with Margis and Schüller) won seven events out of eight. The eighth event was won by Rostislav Gaitiukevich and Mikhail Mordasov. Friedrich won the World Cup, followed by Kripps, Gaitiukevich, and Lochner.

Qualification

There was a quota of 30 sleds available for the men's two-man event. Qualification was based on the world rankings of the 2021/2022 season between 15 October 2020 and 16 January 2022. Pilots must have competed in six different races on three different tracks and been ranked in at least five of those races. Additionally, the pilot must been ranked among the top 50 for the man's events or top 40 for the women's events.

For the men's races the IBSF ranking will be used. The top two nations in the rankings earned three sled each. The next seven nations earned two sleds each, while the next ten earned one sled each. The IBSF announced final quotas on January 24, 2022.

Summary

Results

References

Bobsleigh at the 2022 Winter Olympics
Men's events at the 2022 Winter Olympics